This list article contains names of notable people commonly considered as Sufis or otherwise associated with Sufism.

List of notable Sufis

A

 Abu Baqar Siddique
 Abadir Umar ar-Rida
 Abu Bakr al-Kalabadhi
 Abu Nu'aym al-Isfahani
 Alauddin Sabir Kaliyari 
 Al-Fudayl ibn 'Iyad
 Al-Hakim al-Tirmidhi
 Al-Qushayri
 Abu al-Husain al-Nuri
 Abu Madyan
 Al-Sha'rani
 Al-Suyuti
 Al-Zaylaʽi
 Abu al-Abbas al-Mursi
 'Abd Allah ibn 'Alawi Al-Haddad
 Abd al-Ghani al-Nabulsi
 Ahmad al-Tijani
 Ahmad Zarruq
 Ali al-Qari
 Ali Sher Bengali
 Ahmad Sirhindi
 Ahmad al-Dardir
 Ahmad ibn Ajiba
 Ahmad al-Tayyeb
 Ahmad Yasawi
 Ali Gomaa
 Ali al-Jifri
 Abdalqadir as-Sufi
 Abdul Qadir Gilani
 Ameer Muhammad Akram Awan 
 Abdūl-Khāqeem Arvāsī
 Abdullah Ibn Umar Badheeb Al Yamani (1825–1892)
 Ad-Dağhestānī 
 Mufti Akhtar Raza Khan Azhari
 Abdul Waahid Bin Zaid 
 Abu Ishaq Shami 
 Ahmad al-Alawi
 Ahmed Reza Khan Fazil-e-Barelvi  (1856–1921)
 Kayhan Dede
 As-Sagheer (1815 - 1905)
 Al-Shaghourī
 Al-Busiri
 Ali Hujwiri (Daata Ganj Bakhsh, Persian/Punjabi: 990-1077)
 Ahamed Mohiyudheen Noorishah Jeelani
 Amadou Bamba (1853-1927)
 Arshadul Qaudri (1925–2002)
 Ata Hussain Fani Chishti (1817–1896)
 Azangachhi Shaheb (1828 or 1829-1932)

B

ustad e Zaman moulana hasan Raza Khan bareilvy
Mufti e Azam moulana mustafa Raza Khan 
ustad ul ulama Allama hasnain Raza Khan bareilvy
sadrul ulama Allama Tehseen Raza Khan barwilvy 
 Baba Rexheb
 Baba Qamar U Zaman Faridi Chishti (1940-2011)
 Babajan (1806–1931)
 Bande Nawaz
 Barkat Ali
 Bawa Muhaiyaddeen
 Bishr al-Hafi
 Bu Ali Shah Qalandar

D

 Dawud al-Ta'i
 Dhul-Nun al-Misri

E

El Hadj Malick Sy
 Esad Erbili

F

 Feisal Abdul Rauf

G

 Galip Hassan Kuscuoglu
 Ghousi Shah
 Ghulam Mustafa Khan

H

 Haji Imdadullah Muhaajir Makki (1817–1899)
 Harith al-Muhasibi
 Hasan al-Basri
 Hasnain Baqai safipur
 Hisham Kabbani
 Hilmi Işık

I

 Ibn 'Ashir
 Ibn 'Ata' Allah al-Sakandari
 Ibn 'Arabi
 Ibn Hajar al-Haytami
 Ibrahim ibn Adham
 Ibrahim ibn Faïd
 Ibrahim Niass (1900 - 1975)
 Idries Shah
 Inayat Khan (1882–1927)
 Ismail Haqqi Bursevi
 Izz al-Din ibn 'Abd al-Salam
 Ivan Aguéli (1869-1917)

J

 Jahaniyan Jahangasht
 Jalaluddin Surkh-Posh Bukhari

K

 Khwaja Gharib Nawaz Hindal Wali
 Khwaja Bandanawaz

L

 Lal Shahbaz Qalandar

M 

 Machiliwale Shah
 Mahmoodullah Shah
 Mahmud Esad Coşan
 Mahmut Ustaosmanoğlu
 Makdoom Hamzah
 Maruf Karkhi
 Maula Shah (1836–1944)
 Maulana Fazl-e-Haq Khairabadi (1797–1861)
 Maulana Syed Muhammad Zauqi Shah (1878–1951)
 Meher Ali Shah of Golra Sharif (1859–1937) 
 Shaykh Muhammed Mehmet Adil ar-Rabbani
 Mian Bashir Ahmed (1923– )
 Mir Sayyid Ali Hamadani 
 Muhammad Bin Husayn al-Sulami
 Mohammad Badshah Qadri (1903–1978) 
 Muhammad al-Yaqoubi
 Muhammad Alawi al-Maliki
 Muhammad Iqbal
 Muhammad Ishaq
 Muhammad Masihullah Khan
 Muhammad Metwalli al-Sha'rawi
 Muhammad Qadiri  ( 1552-1654)
 Muhammad Zakariyya Kandhlawi

N

 Nadir Ali Shah
 Nahid Angha
 Nasiruddin Chiragh Dehlavi
 Nizamuddin Auliya
 Nooruddeen Durkee
 Nuh Ha Mim Keller

O

 Omar Saidou Tall
 Omar Ali-Shah
 Osman Nuri Topbaş

P

 Pir Fazal Ali Qureshi (d. 1935)
 Pir Muhammad Alauddin Siddiqui (1936-2017)
 Pir Hadi Hassan Bux Shah Jilani
 Pir Naseer-uddin-Naseer of Golra Sharif (1949–2009)

Q

 Qalander Ba Ba Auliya (1898–1979)
 Qutbuddin Bakhtiar Kaki

 Qurban Ali Shah rh Rajgarh
Hazrat sayed shah Qurban ali shah Baba Badakhshani rh

R

 Rabi'a al-'Adawiyya
 Rahman Baba
 Reshad Feild
 Riaz Ahmed Gohar Shahi
 Rumi 
 Ruwaym

S

 Sari al-Saqati
 Sahl al-Tustari
 Shaqiq al-Balkhi
 Sidi Boushaki
 Shah Waliullah Dehlawi
 Syed Faiz-ul Hassan Shah
 Syed Rashid Ahmed Jaunpuri
 Syed Ghulam Mohiyyuddin Gilani
 Sultan Bahu (1630-1691)
 Shah Maroof Khushabi
 Shah Sulaimān Nūri (1508-1604)
 Sai Baba of Shirdi (1838–1918)
 Said al-Chirkawi
 Said Nursī
 Shams Ali Qalandar
 Sayed Badiuddin Zinda Shah Madar 
 Sayyid Mir Jan (1800-1901)
 Sayyid Sahib Husayni of Tekmal (1805–1880)
 Shah Abdul Aziz (1745–1823)
 Shah Inayat Qadiri (d. 1728)
 Shah Jalal (1271-1346)
 Shah Mustafa
 Shah Nazar Ali 
Kianfar
 Shah Niyaz (1742-1834)
 Syed Ahmad Hussain Gilani
 Shah Nooranī
 Shah Paran
 Shah Siddiq
 Shah Syed Hasnain Baqai of Safipur
 Sheikh Mustafa (1836–1888)
 Sheikh Madar
 Sidi Heddi
 Süleyman Hilmi Tunahan
 Syed Mohammed Asrarullah (1856)
 Syed Nasiruddin
 Syed Shujaat Ali Qadri
 Shah Abdul Latif Bhittai
 Syed Mohammed Mukhtar Ashraf
 Saalim Al-Madhar (1848–1908)

T

 Tahir Allauddin Al-Qadri Al-Gillani (1932–1991)
 Taj al-Din al-Subki
 Tajuddin Muhammad Badruddin of Nagpur (1861–1925)
 Taqi al-Din al-Subki
 Tashna (1872–1931)
 Timothy Winter
 Tosun Bayrak

U

 Uways al-Barawi

W

 Waheed Ashraf
 Waris Shah
 Waris Ali Shah
 Wasif Ali Wasif (1929–1993)

Y

 Yahya ibn Mu'adh al-Razi
 Yunus Ali Enayetpuri (1886-1952)
 Yunus Emre
 Yusuf al-Nabhani

Z

 Zaheen Shah
 Zakariyya al-Ansari

Sufi leaders 
 Emir Abdelkader
 Izz ad-Din al-Qassam
 Mehmed the Conqueror
 Omar al-Mukhtar
 Saladin
 Aurangzeb

See also 
 List of Sufi saints

References

 
Sufi people